Neuweiler is a municipality of the Calw district and region of Karlsruhe of Baden-Württemberg, Germany.

History
The municipality of Neuweiler was formed in 1975 by the merging of the towns of Agenbach, Breitenberg, Gaugenwald, Neuweiler, Oberkollwangen, and Zwerenberg

Geography
The municipality (Gemeinde) of Neuweiler is located at the center of the district of Calw, in the German state of Baden-Württemberg. Neuweiler is physically located upon the plateaus and in the valleys of the Enz and Nagold in the Black Forest, though portions of its municipal area fall into the Grinde. Elevation above sea level in the municipal area ranges from a high of  Normalnull (NN) to a low of  NN.

Portions of the Federally protected  and  nature reserves are located in Neuweiler's municipal area.

Politics
Neuweiler has six boroughs (Ortsteile) – Agenbach, Breitenberg, Gaugenwald, Neuweiler, Oberkollwangen, Zwerenberg – and five villages: Agenbacher Sägmühle, Dachshof, Glasmühle, Hofstett, Weikenmühle. The industrial zone of Aisbach is also found in the municipal area. Neuweiler is a member of the Teinachtal Municipal Association with the cities of Bad Teinach-Zavelstein and Neubulach.

Coat of arms
Neuweiler's municipal coat of arms shows a bugle, in black, with silver fittings and a red carry strap upon a field of yellow. The overall black-yellow tincture is taken from Württemberg's coat of arms. When the municipality of Neuweiler was formed in 1975, Neuweiler's arms were retained for municipal use and were approved for that role by the Calw district office on 22 November 1976. A municipal flag was also issued to Neuweiler on that date.

Transportation

References

External links

  (in German)

Calw (district)
Württemberg